The Scandinavian Journal of Public Health is a peer-reviewed academic journal covering the field of public health. The journal's editor-in-chief is Terje Andreas Eikemo (Norwegian University of Science and Technology). The journal was established in 1973 and is published by SAGE Publications on behalf of the Associations of Public Health in the Nordic Countries. In November 2017, the journal published a special issue in honor of sir Michael Marmot.

Abstracting and indexing
The journal is abstracted and indexed in Scopus, the Science Citation Index Expanded, and the Social Sciences Citation Index. According to the Journal Citation Reports, its 2021 impact factor was 3.199.

References

External links

SAGE Publishing academic journals
English-language journals
8 times per year journals